The 2012–13 season was the 109th season of competitive football in Spain. It started officially on 1 July 2012 and ended on 30 June 2013.

Competitions dates
La Liga and Segunda División started for its first time around middle August, after previous season it was frustrated because of strike. All competitions made a break during Christmas holidays between 24 December 2012 and 3 January 2013.

Transfer windows

Retirements
The following players retired from association football at the end of 2011–12 season or during this season, being the last club a member of 2012–13 La Liga or 2012–13 Segunda División:

Promotion and relegation (pre-season)
Teams promoted to 2012–13 La Liga
 Deportivo de La Coruña
 Celta de Vigo
 Real Valladolid

Teams relegated from 2011–12 La Liga
 Villarreal CF
 Sporting de Gijón
 Racing de Santander

Teams promoted to 2012–13 Segunda División
 Real Madrid Castilla
 CD Mirandés
 SD Ponferradina
 CD Lugo

Teams relegated from 2011–12 Segunda División
 Villarreal CF B
 FC Cartagena
 CD Alcoyano
 Gimnàstic de Tarragona

Teams promoted to 2012–13 Segunda División B

Teams relegated from 2011–12 Segunda División B

National team

The home team is on the left column; the away team is on the right column.

FIFA World Cup qualifiers
Spain was in Group I of the 2014 World Cup qualification process.

FIFA Confederations Cup
Spain participated in the 2013 FIFA Confederations Cup. Spain was in Group B and was winner in this group.

Friendlies

Spanish friendly tournaments
List of some friendly matches or short tournaments celebrated in Spain, mainly at summer as part of pre-season, which participated La Liga and Segunda División teams. Other historical tournaments are also included.

Other unofficial/friendly tournaments 
Other unofficial major tournaments or friendly matches celebrated in Spain were:
 2012 Supercopa de Catalunya (suspended)
 2012 Castilla y León Cup
 2011–12 Copa Catalunya Final
 2012–13 Copa Catalunya
 2012 Basque Country national football team friendly match
 2013 Catalonia national football team friendly match (Trofeu Catalunya Internacional)
 2013 Maspalomas International Football Tournament
 2013 Football Impact Cup 
 2013 Copa del Sol
 2013 Costa del Sol Trophy 
 2013 Bahía de Cádiz Cup
 2013 Marbella Cup
 2013 La Manga Cup

Competitions

Trophy & League Champions

League tables

La Liga

Segunda División

Spanish clubs in Europe

UEFA Champions League

Play-off round

Group stage

Group C

Group D

Group F

Group G

Knockout phase

Round of 16

Quarter-finals

Semi-finals

UEFA Europa League

Third qualifying round

Play-off Round

Group stage

Group B

Group I

Group L

Knockout phase

Round of 32

Round of 16

UEFA Super Cup

Final

References